The 2022 CRC Brakleen 150 was the 16th stock car race of the 2022 NASCAR Camping World Truck Series, the final race of the regular season, and the 13th iteration of the event. The race was held on Saturday, July 23, 2022, in Long Pond, Pennsylvania at Pocono Raceway, a  permanent triangular-shaped racetrack. The race took the scheduled 60 laps to complete. Chandler Smith, driving for Kyle Busch Motorsports, held off Ryan Preece in the final few laps, and earned his fourth career NASCAR Camping World Truck Series win, and his second of the season. Smith would also dominate the race, leading 49 laps. To fill out the podium, John Hunter Nemechek, driving for Kyle Busch Motorsports, would finish 3rd, respectively. 

The ten drivers to qualify for the NASCAR playoffs are Zane Smith, Chandler Smith, Ben Rhodes, John Hunter Nemechek, Stewart Friesen, Christian Eckes, Ty Majeski, Carson Hocevar, Grant Enfinger, and Matt Crafton. Zane Smith would also win the Regular Season Championship following the race. 

This race also marked the 800th and final NASCAR start for Todd Bodine.

Background 
Pocono Raceway (formerly Pocono International Raceway), also known as The Tricky Triangle, is a superspeedway located in the Pocono Mountains in Long Pond, Pennsylvania. It is the site of three NASCAR national series races and an ARCA Menards Series event in July: a NASCAR Cup Series race with support events by the NASCAR Xfinity Series and NASCAR Camping World Truck Series. From 1971 to 1989, and from 2013 to 2019, the track also hosted an Indy Car race, currently sanctioned by the IndyCar Series. Additionally, from 1982 to 2021, it hosted two NASCAR Cup Series races, with the traditional first date being removed for 2022.

Pocono is one of the few NASCAR tracks not owned by either NASCAR or Speedway Motorsports, the dominant track owners in NASCAR. Pocono CEO Nick Igdalsky and president Ben May are members of the family-owned Mattco Inc, started by Joseph II and Rose Mattioli.  Mattco also owns South Boston Speedway in South Boston, Virginia.

Outside NASCAR and IndyCar Series races, Pocono is used throughout the year by the Stock Car Experience, Bertil Roos Driving School, Sports Car Club of America (SCCA) as well as many other clubs and organizations. The triangular track also has three separate infield sections of racetrack – the north course, east course and south course. Each of these infield sections use separate portions of the track or can be combined for longer and more technical course configurations. In total Pocono Raceway has offers 22 different road course configurations ranging from .5 miles to 3.65 miles in length. During regular non-race weekends, multiple clubs or driving schools can use the track simultaneously by running on different infield sections. All of the infield sections can also be run in either clockwise or counter clockwise direction which doubles the 22 course configuration to 44 total course options.

Entry list 

 (R) denotes rookie driver.
 (i) denotes driver who are ineligible for series driver points.

Starting lineup 
Practice and qualifying were scheduled to be held on Friday, July 22, at 4:00 PM EST, and 4:30 PM EST, but were both cancelled to due to inclement weather. The starting lineup would be determined by a performance-based metric system. As a result, Zane Smith, driving for Front Row Motorsports, would earn the pole. Bryan Dauzat and Norm Benning would fail to qualify.

Race results 
Stage 1 Laps: 15

Stage 2 Laps: 15

Stage 3 Laps: 30

Standings after the race 

Drivers' Championship standings

Note: Only the first 10 positions are included for the driver standings.

References 

2022 NASCAR Camping World Truck Series
NASCAR races at Pocono Raceway
CRC Brakleen 150
2022 in sports in Pennsylvania